McLeod School was built in 1882 on N 27-14-1W (near the present day village of Argyle, Manitoba) and named after Dugald McLeod, councillor of Ward 6 and one of the earliest residents to the area. The school was built by James F. McCulloch, and early teachers were James McLeod, Violet (Patterson) Ballantyne, Miss Hornabrook, J.J. Campbell, A.M. Campbell, Alex Todd, E.R. Mills, Fred Baragar and Grace Patterson.

The school district was dissolved into the Brant Consolidated School (Brant-Argyle School) November 8, 1913. That same year, the McLeod school joined Brant and Bruce Schools in consolidating with the Brant Consolidated School in Argyle Station (Argyle village)

After the school was closed, Mr. Sheldrick made this building into a home. Thomas & Barbara Snell bought the former McLeod School in 1924 and had John Morrison (Barbara's father) renovate the school into a home. They lived there until 1954. The structure sat empty for a few years until it was moved by Alf Billingham to his farm one mile south and one mile west of the school's site.

References 
http://www.settlersrailsandtrials.com (Settlers, Rails & Trails Inc, Argyle, Manitoba)
http://www.mhs.mb.ca/docs/sites/mcleodschool.shtml (Manitoba Historical Society - McLeod School)
Yesteryears, history of Woodlands Municipality (book)
Woodlands Echoes History book (book)

Elementary schools in Manitoba
Educational institutions established in 1882
1882 establishments in Manitoba